Chloride intracellular channel 4, also known as CLIC4, is a eukaryotic gene.

Chloride channels are a diverse group of proteins that regulate fundamental cellular processes including stabilization of cell membrane potential, transepithelial transport, maintenance of intracellular pH, and regulation of cell volume. Chloride intracellular channel 4 (CLIC4) protein, encoded by the CLIC4 gene, is a member of the p64 family; the gene is expressed in many tissues and exhibits an intracellular vesicular pattern in PANC-1 cells (pancreatic cancer cells).

Binding partners 
CLIC4 binds to dynamin I, α-tubulin, β-actin, creatine kinase and two 14-3-3 isoforms.

See also
 Chloride channel

References

Further reading

External links
 
 

Ion channels